The 10th congressional district of Illinois lies in the northeast corner of the state and mostly comprises northern suburbs of Chicago. It was created after the 1860 census. The district is currently represented by Democrat Brad Schneider.

History
The area of the district was originally represented by one of Abraham Lincoln's closest allies, Elihu B. Washburne (R-Waukegan). The district was created in 1982 redistricting out of districts represented by John Porter (R-Wilmette) and Robert McClory (R-Lake Bluff). On the retirement of McClory, the district was represented by Porter after winning the elections of 1982, 1984, 1986, 1988, 1990, 1992, 1994, 1996, and 1998. Following Porter's retirement, 11 Republicans and two Democrats ran to succeed him. Eventually 9 Republicans and one Democrat stood for election in the primary of March 2000. John Porter's former Chief of Staff, Mark Kirk, won the Republican primary over number two rival Shaun Donnely. Kirk then defeated State Representative Lauren Beth Gash (D-Highland Park) by 2% in the 2000 general election. Kirk remained in Congress until he decided to run for the United States Senate in the 2010 election. He was succeeded by Republican Robert Dold.

Geographic boundaries

2011 redistricting
The district covers parts of Cook and Lake counties, as of the 2011 redistricting which followed the 2010 census. All or parts of Beach Park, Buffalo Grove, Deerfield, Fox Lake, Glencoe, Grayslake, Highland Park, Lake Bluff, Lake Forest, Lake Villa, Lindenhurst, Libertyville, Morton Grove, Mundelein, North Chicago, Northbrook, Prospect Heights, Round Lake, Round Lake Beach, Vernon Hills, Waukegan, Wheeling, and Zion are included. The boundaries became effective on January 3, 2013.

2021 redistricting

Following the 2020 redistricting, this district will be primarily based in Lake County, bordering the state of Wisconsin, as well as northeast McHenry County and a part of northern Cook County.

The 10th district takes in the Cook County communities of Winnetka, Glencoe, Kenilworth, Northbrook, and Wheeling.

Lake County is split between this district, the 9th district, and the 11th district. They are partitioned by Buffalo Grove Golf Course, Buffalo Grove Rd, Arboretum Golf Club, W Half Day Rd, Promontory Ridge Trail, Port Clinton Rd, Mundelein Rd, Highland Pines Park, Diamond Lake Rd, Breckinridge Dr, N Midlothian Rd, Illinois Route 60, W Hawley St, N Chevy Chase Rd, Steeple Chase Golf Club, W Lakeview Parkway, N Gilmer Rd, Hawley St, W Ivanhoe Rd, N Fairfield Rd, W Chardon Rd, N Wilson Rd, W Townline Rd, N US Highway 12, W Brandenburg Rd, and Volo Bog State Natural Area. The 10th district takes in the municipalities of Antioch, Fox Lake, Lake Villa, Grayslake, Mundelein, Vernon Hills, Waukegan, Highland Park, North Chicago, Park City, Lake Forest, Gurnee, Zion, Libertyville, Round Lake, Round Lake, and Round Lake Beach.

McHenry County is split between this district, the 11th district, and the 16th district. The 10th, 11th, and 16th districts are partitioned by Lily Lake Drain, W Rand Rd, Fox River, N Riverside Dr, Illinois Highway 31, Petersen Farm, Dutch Creek, McCullom Lake Rd, White Oak Ln, McCullom Lake, W Shore Dr, W Martin Rd, Bennington Ln, N Martin Rd, N Curran Rd, Old Draper Rd, Farmstead Dr, S Ridge Rd, N Valley Hill Rd, Barber Creek, Wonder Lake, Illinois Highway 120, Thompson Rd, Nusbaum Rd, Slough Creek, Johnson Rd, and Nicholas Rd. The 10th district takes in the municipalities of Spring Grove, Richmond, Hebron, Wonder Lake, and Johnsburg.

District characteristics

Economy
The 10th is home to several Fortune 500 companies, including, but not limited to: CDW, Walgreens, Underwriters Laboratories, Caterpillar, Inc., Baxter Healthcare, AbbVie, Allstate Insurance, and Mondelez International.

Military
The Naval Station Great Lakes near North Chicago, hosting the United States Navy's only boot camp, trains 38,000 recruits each year. 5.2% of the district's inhabitants have performed military service.

Recent election results

U.S. President

Governor

Senator

U.S. Representative

List of members representing the district

Recent election results

2006 

Republican candidate for Governor, Judy Baar Topinka, and GOP candidate for Cook County Board President Tony Peraica both handily won the district in 2006, although both lost in the state- and countywide (respectively) count.

2008 

Dan Seals, who had previously run against Mark Kirk in 2006, defeated Clinton Advisor Jay Footlik for the 2008 Democratic nomination. Dave Kalbfleisch received the Green Party nomination, but was removed from the ballot by the Illinois State Board of Elections. Independent candidate Allan Stevo was also nominated. Mark Kirk defeated Dan Seals in their rematch from 2006 by 54% to 46%, thus winning a fifth term in the House.

2010 

The Republican Party nominee, Robert Dold, won against the Democratic Party nominee, Dan Seals.

2012

Robert Dold no longer lives in the redrawn district, but said he would move into the district if he won re-election.

Candidates for the Democratic nomination were: Ilya Sheyman, a community organizer from Waukegan, Brad Schneider, a business consultant, John Tree, a business executive and Colonel in the Air Force Reserve, and Vivek Bavda, an intellectual property attorney.

In the March 20, 2012 primary, Brad Schneider won the Democratic nomination. Schneider defeated Dold in the general election in November.

2014

Brad Schneider, the incumbent, was selected to be the Democratic nominee, and Robert Dold was once again selected to be the Republican nominee. Dold won the election with just over 50% of the vote.

2016

Brad Schneider defeated Highland Park Mayor Nancy Rotering for the Democratic nomination on March 15. Democrat Brad Schneider defeated Republican Robert Dold by nearly 5% (14,000 votes), the largest victory margin in Illinois's 10th Congressional district since redistricting.

2018

Brad Schneider, the incumbent, defeated his republican challenger Douglas R. Bennett with 65.6% of the vote. There were three Republican candidates who ran in the primary: Bennett of Deerfield, who is a computer consultant and vice chairman of the West Deerfield Township Republican Organization, Libertyville physician and business owner Sapan Shah, and Jeremy Wynes of Highland Park.

Robert Dold declined to run for a fifth time. 

On March 20, Douglas Bennett narrowly beat Wynes and Shah in the primary.

2020

Incumbent representative Brad Schneider faced two Democratic primary challengers in 2020. Progressive activist Andrew Wang was the first to announce a challenge to Schneider, followed shortly by fellow progressive Adam Broad. After Wang dropped out and threw his support to Broad, Broad fell short of qualifying for the ballot and mounted a write-in campaign. Broad ultimately received less than 1% of the primary vote. 

In the general election, which was held on November 3rd, 2020, Schneider defeated Republican challenger Valerie Ramirez Mukherjee, earning nearly two-thirds of the vote.

2022

Historical district boundaries

See also

Illinois's congressional districts
List of United States congressional districts

References

 Congressional Biographical Directory of the United States 1774–present

External links
Washington Post page on the 10th District of Illinois
U.S. Census Bureau - 10th District Fact Sheet

10
Congress-10
Constituencies established in 1863
1863 establishments in Illinois